The 1915–16 İstanbul Football League season was the 11th season of the league. Galatasaray won the league for the fifth time. NB: starting from this season, a 3-2-1 point system was used, with clubs receiving no points for forfeit losses.

Season

Matches

Galatasaray SK - Anadolu Üsküdar 1908 SK: 4-0
Galatasaray SK - Fenerbahçe SK: 2-2 
Galatasaray SK - Küçükçekmece SK: 3-2
Galatasaray SK - Altınordu İdman Yurdu SK: 2-0
Galatasaray SK - Anadolu Hisarı İdman Yurdu SK: 5-2
Galatasaray SK - Anadolu Üsküdar 1908 SK: 1-1
Galatasaray SK - Fenerbahçe SK: 1-3
Galatasaray SK - Altınordu İdman Yurdu SK: 5-0
Galatasaray SK - Küçükçekmece SK: 5-2
Galatasaray SK - Anadolu Hisarı İdman Yurdu SK: 3-0
Fenerbahçe SK - Altınordu İdman Yurdu SK: 1-2
Fenerbahçe SK - Anadolu Hisarı İdman Yurdu SK: 3-0
Fenerbahçe SK - Küçükçekmece SK: 12-0
Fenerbahçe SK - Anadolu Üsküdar 1908 SK: 1-2
Fenerbahçe SK - Altınordu İdman Yurdu SK: 3-1
Fenerbahçe SK - Anadolu Hisarı İdman Yurdu SK: 6-0
Fenerbahçe SK - Küçükçekmece SK: 4-1
Fenerbahçe SK - Anadolu Üsküdar 1908 SK: 1-1

References
 Tuncay, Bülent (2002). Galatasaray Tarihi. Yapı Kredi Yayınları 
 Dağlaroğlu, Rüştü. Fenerbahçe Spor Kulübü Tarihi 1907-1957

Istanbul Football League seasons
Istanbul
Istanbul